Thieves of Fortune (other titles - Chameleon and May the Best Man Win) is a 1990 American action film directed by Michael MacCarthy. It is Lee Van Cleef's last film, released the year after he died of a heart attack.

Premise
In order to gain a large inheritance, a woman must do many arduous and dangerous tasks to prove her worth and win the affections of the man she loves.

Cast
 Michael Nouri as Comandante Juan Luis Ferreira
 Lee Van Cleef as Don Sergio Danielo Christophoro (Last appearing film role)
 Shawn Weatherly as Petra Christopher / Peter
 Craig Gardner as H.H. Christopher
 Liz Torres as Big Rosa, Prostitute 
 Russel Savadier as Miguel, Juan Luis' Sidekick
 John Hussey as Sir Nigel, Sergio's Lawyer 
 Jon Maytham as Flagstead, Nigel's Secretary 
 Michael Fisher as Mr. Forstman
 Tony Caprari as Chief Priest / Eavesdropper
 Joe Ribeiro as Police Inspector
 Charles Kinsman as Nunzio
 Nadia Bilchik as Isobella, 2nd Prostitute
 Nobby Clark as Spur McGuigan
 Claudia Udy as Marissa, Sergio's Nurse
 Danie Voges as Gomez, Police Inspector's Goon
 Graham Weir as Pirana, Gomez's Sidekick 
 Alan Pierce as Mr. Christopher
 Pamela Perry as Luella Christopher, HH's Mother
 Lance Ellington as The Balladeer (voice) (uncredited)
 Sandra Prinsloo (uncredited)
 Marius Weyers (uncredited)

References

External links

1990 films
1990 action films
American action adventure films
1990s English-language films
1990s American films